László Dávid Oláh (born 16 December 1995) is a Hungarian footballer who currently plays as a forward for Békéscsaba 1912 Előre.

Career statistics

Club

Notes

References

1995 births
Living people
Hungarian footballers
Association football forwards
Vasas SC players
FC Ajka players
Békéscsaba 1912 Előre footballers
Nemzeti Bajnokság I players
Nemzeti Bajnokság II players
People from Békéscsaba
Sportspeople from Békés County
21st-century Hungarian people